Argja Bóltfelag is a Faroese football club based in Argir.

The women's team of Argja Bóltfelag play in the 1. deild kvinnur in 2020, the second division in Faroese football. They play their home games at Vika Stadium, in Argir.

History
Argja Bóltfelag (or AB) was founded on 15 August 1973 by Danish resident Johnny Nyby and other football lovers on Argir. In the spring of 1974 AB got a board, composed of Johnny Nyby, Chairman; Fróði Olsen, Co-Chairman; Sonja á Argjaboða, accountant; and Kristian Arge, board writer. Other members of the board were Erling Olsen, Sæmundur Mortensen and Jens Hansen. In the same year the team started in the regular competition.

They had poor training facilities at first – they trained in a school yard. Later they got a small ground to train on, but it was only 20 x 40 m². There was no football field on Argir at the time, but they were allowed to loan the field Gundadalur, which belongs to HB and B36. AB practiced and played their matches in Gundadalur, and this helped the team to survive.

In 1983 a football field was built on Argjum. This helped the team a lot, because they had their own field. In 1985 a new two-stores house was built for AB. AB did get the lower store, and the second store was a school classroom.

For some years, the second store remained a kindergarten school. In 1998 artificial grass was put on the football field, and the team had the same training facility as the rest of the football teams in the Faroes. In 2004 AB had grown enough to get the whole house.

In the summer of 2009, they are building seats for the fans to sit down, AB have never had seats, and that is the rules from FIFA.

Recent history

In 2009 AB had a chance to win cup final, it was against record cup winner KÍ Klaksvík. AB made history and they won the cup for the first time. The result was 2–1 to AB, Mona Brekkman scored the first goal to make it 1–0, then KÍ Klaksvík equalized, but Brekkman scored again and the final score was 2–1 to AB.

In 2011 they again reached the cup final, but this time lost 1–0 to KI.

First-team squad

Current squad
The former team:

Technical staff
As of 2020.

References

External links
Club's website (in Faorese)

Argja Bóltfelag
Association football clubs established in 1973
Women's football clubs in the Faroe Islands
1973 establishments in the Faroe Islands